The Rosie River also known as Rosie Creek is a river in the Northern Territory, Australia.

The headwaters at found at the northern end of the Tawallah Range and the river flows in an easterly direction across the uninhabited plain then discharging into the Gulf of Carpentaria.

It is river dominated in nature with a wave dominated delta and multiple channels and has an area of  covered with mangroves.

See also

List of rivers of Northern Territory

References

Rivers of the Northern Territory
Gulf of Carpentaria